Wolfgang Wolf (born 24 September 1957) is a German football coach and a former player.

Career
Wolf was born in Tiefenthal. As a player, he spent twelve seasons in the Bundesliga with 1. FC Kaiserslautern and Stuttgarter Kickers.

Coaching career
Wolf spent eight  more seasons in the Bundesliga as a coach with VfL Wolfsburg, 1. FC Nürnberg and 1. FC Kaiserslautern. In July 2009 Wolf joined Super League Greece club Skoda Xanthi F.C. but left the club in  September 2009 for personal reasons. On 9 February 2010, Wolf was named as the new head coach of Kickers Offenbach, replacing Steffen Menze. In October 2019, he became new manager of 1. FC Lokomotive Leipzig.

Personal life
His son Patrick Wolf also became a professional footballer. In June 2012, Wolf signed his son while working as manager for Hansa Rostock.

Coaching record

Honours
 DFB-Pokal finalist: 1980–81

References

External links
 

1957 births
Living people
People from Bad Dürkheim (district)
Association football defenders
German football managers
German footballers
1. FC Kaiserslautern players
Stuttgarter Kickers players
VfL Wolfsburg managers
1. FC Nürnberg managers
FC Hansa Rostock managers
Kickers Offenbach managers
Bundesliga players
2. Bundesliga players
Stuttgarter Kickers managers
1. FC Kaiserslautern managers
Xanthi F.C. managers
Bundesliga managers
2. Bundesliga managers
3. Liga managers
Footballers from Rhineland-Palatinate
West German footballers
German expatriate football managers
German expatriate sportspeople in Greece
Expatriate football managers in Greece